October 16 - Eastern Orthodox liturgical calendar - October 18

All fixed commemorations below celebrated on October 30 by Eastern Orthodox Churches on the Old Calendar.

For October 17th, Orthodox Churches on the Old Calendar commemorate the Saints listed on October 4.

Saints
 Prophet Hosea (Osee) (820 BC)  (see also: December 4, July 4)
 Holy Martyrs and Unmercenary Physicians Cosmas and Damian, and their brothers, martyrs Leontius, Anthimus, and Eutropius, and 15 Holy Unmercenaries with them, in Cilicia (4th century)
 Saints Antigonus, Loukianos, Terentius, Nicomedes and Theophanis. 
 Saints Isidora and Neophyte.
 Martyr Queen Shushanik (Susanna) of Georgia (475)  (see also: August 28)
 Hieromartyr Andrew of Crete, in "the Judgment" (767)

Pre-Schism Western saints
 Saint Ignatius of Antioch, called 'the God-bearer', Bishop of Antioch (107)  (see also: December 20 - East)
 Saint Solina, born in Gascony in France, she escaped to Chartres to avoid marriage to a pagan, was beheaded in Chartres (c. 290)
 Saint Regulus (Rule), by tradition an abbot who brought relics of St Andrew from Greece to Scotland, leading to St Andrew's adoption as the patron-saint of Scotland (4th century)
 Saint Florentius of Orange, the eighth Bishop of Orange in the south of France (c. 526)
 Saint Victor of Capua, consecrated Bishop of Capua in Italy in 541 and a prolific writer (554)
 Saint Colmán of Kilroot, a disciple of St Ailbe of Emly and Bishop of Kilroot near Carrickfergus in Ireland (6th century)
 Saint Louthiern, born in Ireland, he is the patron-saint of St Ludgran in Cornwall (6th century)
 Martyrs Æthelred and Æthelberht, Princes of Kent (c. 640)
 Saint Berarius, Bishop of Le Mans in France (c. 680)
 Saint Anstrudis of Laon (688)
 Saint Nothhelm, eleventh Archbishop of Canterbury and a friend of St Bede and St Boniface (739)

Post-Schism Orthodox saints
 Martyr Kozman (Kosmas), of Georgia.
 Venerable Anthony, founder of Leokhnov Monastery, Novgorod (1611)
 Saint Ioseb (Jandierishvili) the Wonderworker, Catholicos of Georgia (1770)

New Martys and Confessors
 New Hieromartyrs Neophyt Lyubimov and Anatoly Ivanovsky, Priests (1918)
 New Monk-martyrs Jacinthus Pitatelev and Callistus Oparin, of the St. Nicholas Monastery, Verkhoturye (1918)
 New Hieromartyr Alexander (Shchukin), Archbishop of Semipalatinsk (1937)

Other commemorations
 Translation of the relics (695) of St. Etheldreda, Royal Abbess of Ely (679)  (see also: June 23 )
 Translation of the relics (898) of St. Lazarus "Of the Four Days" (in the tomb), Bishop of Kition in Cyprus (1st century)
 Icon of the Mother of God "In Giving Birth, you Preserved your Virginity" (1827)
 Icon of the Mother of God the "Deliveress" / Rescuer (1889)  (see also: October 1, October 28 and April 4)
 Synaxis of the Patron Saints of the Holy Metropolis of Hydra, Spetses and Aegina, in Greece.
 Repose of Elder Athanasius (Zakharov) of Ploshchansk Hermitage (1825), disciple of St. Paisius (Velichkovsky).
 Repose of Nun Alypia, Fool-for-Christ, of Goloseyevo, Kiev (1988)

Icon gallery

Notes

References

Sources 
 October 17/30. Orthodox Calendar (PRAVOSLAVIE.RU).
 October 30 / October 17. HOLY TRINITY RUSSIAN ORTHODOX CHURCH (A parish of the Patriarchate of Moscow).
 October 17. OCA - The Lives of the Saints.
 The Autonomous Orthodox Metropolia of Western Europe and the Americas (ROCOR). St. Hilarion Calendar of Saints for the year of our Lord 2004. St. Hilarion Press (Austin, TX). p. 77.
 The Seventeenth Day of the Month of October. Orthodoxy in China.
 October 17. Latin Saints of the Orthodox Patriarchate of Rome.
 The Roman Martyrology. Transl. by the Archbishop of Baltimore. Last Edition, According to the Copy Printed at Rome in 1914. Revised Edition, with the Imprimatur of His Eminence Cardinal Gibbons. Baltimore: John Murphy Company, 1916. pp. 321.
 Rev. Richard Stanton. A Menology of England and Wales, or, Brief Memorials of the Ancient British and English Saints Arranged According to the Calendar, Together with the Martyrs of the 16th and 17th Centuries. London: Burns & Oates, 1892. pp. 498–502.
Greek Sources
 Great Synaxaristes:  17 ΟΚΤΩΒΡΙΟΥ. ΜΕΓΑΣ ΣΥΝΑΞΑΡΙΣΤΗΣ.
  Συναξαριστής. 17 Οκτωβρίου. ECCLESIA.GR. (H ΕΚΚΛΗΣΙΑ ΤΗΣ ΕΛΛΑΔΟΣ).
  17/10/2017. Ορθόδοξος Συναξαριστής. 
Russian Sources
  30 октября (17 октября). Православная Энциклопедия под редакцией Патриарха Московского и всея Руси Кирилла (электронная версия). (Orthodox Encyclopedia - Pravenc.ru).
  17 октября по старому стилю / 30 октября по новому стилю. Русская Православная Церковь - Православный церковный календарь на 2016 год.

October in the Eastern Orthodox calendar